Torilis arvensis is a species of flowering plant in the family Apiaceae known by the common names spreading hedgeparsley, tall sock-destroyer and common hedge parsley. It is native to parts of Europe and it is known elsewhere, such as North America, as an introduced species and a common weed. It grows in many types of habitat, especially disturbed areas. It is an annual herb producing a slender, branching, rough-haired stem up to a meter in maximum height. The alternately arranged leaves are each divided into several pairs of lance-shaped leaflets up to 6 centimeters long each. The leaflet is divided or deeply cut into segments or teeth. The inflorescence is a wide open compound umbel of flower clusters on long, slender rays. Each flower has five petals which are unequal in size and are white with a pinkish or reddish tinge. Each greenish or pinkish fruit is 3 to 5 millimeters long and is coated in straight or curving prickles.

References

External links

Illinois Wildflowers
Washington Burke Museum
Photo gallery

Apioideae
Flora of Europe
Flora of Western Asia
Flora of Lebanon
Plants described in 1762